Oliver Freund (born 15 April 1970) is a German former professional footballer who played as a midfielder.

Career
Freund joined SV Werder Bremen's U19 youth team from FV Lörrach in 1989.

Honours
Werder Bremen (A)
 German amateur football championship: 1990–91

Hannover 96
 DFB-Pokal: 1991–92

SC Freiburg
 2. Bundesliga: 1992–93

References

Living people
1970 births
German footballers
Association football midfielders
Bundesliga players
SV Werder Bremen players
SV Werder Bremen II players
Hannover 96 players
SC Freiburg players
SK Rapid Wien players
VfL Osnabrück players
West German footballers